Berd ( (Berd, berdapar), "Fortress") is an Armenian dance which originates from the ancient Armenian province of Vaspurakan of the ancient kingdom of Armenia. The dance was part of the old Armenian game "Գմբեթախաղ (Gmbetakhagh)".

About 
During the dance dancers wear only traditional Armenian dress (taraz). The central objective of the dance is to create a fortress, which is a 2-storey human wall. In order to achieve this, dancers stand on top of each other's shoulders.

See also 
 Armenian dance
 Kochari
 Yarkhushta
 Vaspurakan
 Culture of Armenia

References 

Armenian dances